Dabney Carr (April 27, 1773 – January 8, 1837) was a Virginia lawyer, writer and a justice of the Virginia Supreme Court of Appeals.

Early and family life

Martha Peyton Jefferson gave birth to this Dabney Carr at Spring Forest, a Goochland County, Virginia, plantation just three weeks before the death of his father, also named Dabney Carr. His father was a close friend of Thomas Jefferson; his mother was Jefferson's sister; his elder brothers Peter Carr (who served in the Virginia General Assembly) and Samuel Carr received posthumous notoriety as possible fathers of Sally Hemings's children. Jefferson took an active role in the guiding and educating his fatherless nephew, as would his friend James Madison while Jefferson was pursuing diplomatic duties in France. The younger Carr attended Hampden-Sydney College from 1786 to 1789 and returned home to study law with William Wirt, who was just one year older. The two men (and Francis Walker Gilmer) remained friends for the rest of their lives. An extensive collection of their letters can be found in the Manuscripts Department, Library of the University of North Carolina at Chapel Hill.

This Dabney Carr married his paternal cousin, Elizabeth Carr, in June 1802. Although both their sons died young (Dabney Jefferson Carr at age 9), their daughters Nancy Addison Conrad (1803-1868)and Jane Cary Henderson (1807-1859) would marry and have children, and notwithstanding a satirical essay discussed below, Carr educated his daughters.

Career
Carr started his private legal practice in Albemarle and adjoining counties in 1796. In 1802 Albemarle voters elected him commonwealth's attorney (prosecutor), and Carr served for a decade, until resigning in March 1811 to become an interim judge when William H. Cabell was elevated to what was later known as the Virginia Supreme Court (and on which Carr would also later serve). Although the legislature ended up electing another man to fill that vacancy, it created a new district court in chancery and elected Carr as Chancellor for the Winchester District in January 1812, so he moved to Winchester. Meanwhile, Carr published several articles on non-legal topics. Using the pseudonym Obediah Squaretoes, Carr contributed a satirical article to William Wirt's The Old Bachelor (1814). Although he owned no slaves in the 1800 census and only 5 slaves in 1810, in the 1820 census (before his daughters married), Carr owned 22 slaves and his household also included 8 other white people. 
On February 24, 1824, Virginia legislators elected Carr a judge of the Supreme Court of Appeals and he moved to the outskirts of Richmond and held this office until his death. In April 1825 he declined Jefferson's offer to become a professor of law at the University of Virginia, believing himself unqualified to teach. He became known as hardworking, as well as somewhat eccentric for the long walks he favored on a physician's recommendation, particularly because his exercise also involved flinging his arms. In the 1830 census, Judge Carr owned 5 slaves.

Death
Judge Dabney Carr died at his home on January 8, 1837, and is interred in Richmond's Shockoe Hill Cemetery.

References

Justices of the Supreme Court of Virginia
1773 births
1837 deaths
Virginia lawyers
Virginia state court judges
People from Goochland County, Virginia
Hampden–Sydney College alumni
Jefferson family
Virginia colonial people
Burials in Virginia